David Petrovsky (Lipetz) (also known as Max Goldfarb, Bennett, Humboldt, Brown, born September 24, 1886, in Berdychiv, Russian Empire — September 10, 1937, Moscow, Soviet Union) — a member of the Central Committee of the Jewish Socialist Federation of America, a member of the Socialist Party of America, the editor of the Jewish Daily Forward newspaper, journalist, political and economic scientist, a member of the Central Committee of the General Jewish Labour Bund in Lithuania, Poland and Russia (Bund) until 1919, a member of the Central Council of Ukraine (1917-1918), the statesman of the Soviet Union.

Throughout his life Petrovsky (Lipetz)  used the following names: Goldfarb, Bennett, Humboldt, Brown. Each of these names corresponds to a specific period of his life and work.

Biography

Early life 
David Lipetz was born in 1886 in Berdychiv in a family of a wealthy textile merchant Efraim Lipetz. He studied in a Jewish school and at home with private tutors  where he finished the Russian classical gymnasium course. He was the chairman of the literary and theatrical society of Berdychiv. He soon became interested in revolutionary activities, and in 1902 he joined the General Jewish Labour Bund in Lithuania, Poland and Russia (Bund). In 1903 he moved to Paris and enrolled in the Russian Higher School of Social Sciences, where he became acquainted with many of the famous revolutionaries: Vladimir Lenin, Leon Trotsky, Anatoly Lunacharsky.

In the beginning of the 1905 Russian revolution he returned to Russia. He worked among workers of Dvinsk, Bialystok, Gomel, was one of the leaders of the strike at Libava-Romny railroad. At the 7-th Congress of the Bund, where he first used the pseudonym Max Goldfarb, he was elected a candidate for the Central Committee. At the end of 1906 he was arrested by police and spent three months in prison. After that he left Russia - first to England where he participated at the London  5th Congress of the Russian Social Democratic Labour Party, and then to Brussels, where in 1912 he graduated from the Free University of Brussels with a Ph.D. in Economic Sciences (his supervisor was Emile Vandervelde - the future Minister of State of Belgium).

Along with his studies he lectured (as a member of the Bund) in the cities of Belgium and France. Back in Russia he was actively engaged in party work. At the end of 1912, he was arrested in Odessa and sentenced to exile to Siberia which was then replaced with exile from Russia.

Work in the US 

By agreement between the Central Committee of the Bund and the Jewish Socialist Federation (JSF) of the Socialist Party of America, in 1913 David Lipetz came to New York City to conduct work among the Jewish workers and to raise funds for the Bund. In America Lipetz worked and published as Max Goldfarb, and under this name he was elected to the Central Committee of the JSF.

He was sent on a national speaking tour under the auspices of the JSF in early 1914.  During the tour he addressed more than 15,000 in about 40 engagements according to the report of JSF Secretary Jacob Salutsky. In addition to his role as a functionary of the JSF, Goldfarb worked as labor editor of Abraham Cahan's Yiddish-language daily, Forverts (The Forward).

In the summer 1917 after the bourgeois-democratic February revolution in Russia, he returned to Russia with a passport in the name of David Lipetz, on the way he stopped in Stockholm at the International Socialist Congress.

A member of the Central Council of Ukraine and the last mayor of Berdichev 
Upon arrival, David Lipetz was actively involved in the political life of Russia and Ukraine: ran for Russian Constituent Assembly election in 1917, wrote political articles in Bund magazines. He was elected the member of the Central Council of Ukraine, was the member of its Central Executive Committee (Mala Rada). He was elected the mayor of the city and chairman of the Jewish community of Berdichev - the city with the largest share of Jewish population in Ukraine and the Russian Empire. As mayor of the city at that time he also managed to prevent a planned multi-day pogrom in Berdichev that saved  thousands of lives. He was bitterly disappointed in the policy of the Ukrainian People's Republic Government, that encouraged Jewish pogroms. Together with Sore Fox and A. Litvak, David Lipetz headed the Social Democratic Bund in Ukraine (Bund SD) after the split of the Bund in Ukraine in 1918 into communists (Kombund) and social democrats (Bund SD).

Heading the military education in Russia and the Soviet Union 
In April 1919, David Lipetz moved to Kiev, where he met with M.V. Frunze. David Lipetz started working in the Red Army. He organized the struggle against antisemitism and lectured in the Red Army. At the end of 1919 David Lipetz joined the Bolsheviks. He was one of the founders and a member of the Committee for the Struggle against Antisemitism within the Soviet government. The committee included S. Dimanstein, Abram Kheifets,  M. Gorky and other well-known leaders of the revolutionary movement. At the same time David Lipetz entered into a polemic with V. Lenin about the policy of the Bolsheviks regarding the participation of the Jewish population of Ukraine in the work of the state authorities. 

From the book of David Petrovsky "Military education in the years of the revolution (1917-1924)": "I was appointed the head of Speakers bureau in the General Directorate of military education (GUVUZ) in fall of 1919. Since the end of 1919 I'm starting to come into contact with the general operational activity of the military educational institutions, first as the head of the political department of GUVUZ (1919 - early 1920), and then as the chief of the General Directorate of military education, from March 1920 to April 1924."

David Lipetz became David Petrovsky, or just General Petrovsky. He was responsible for all Soviet military education from 1920 till 1924. Military education in the Russian Empire was destroyed by the Russian Revolution  and Russian Civil War. He had a difficult task of rebuilding it during ongoing civil war and unrest, and preparing a young generation in military academies, colleges, and training centers. Some of Petrovsky's ideas were met with resistance, including his idea for the establishment of Soviet military schools for boys. The time for them came  only twenty years later, when the Suvorov Military Schools and the Nakhimov Naval Schools were first  opened. His point of view on the problems of a single military doctrine  caused a sharp controversy between him and  Mikhail Frunze.
 
Yet in 1924 Mikhail Frunze expresses gratitude to him for "the fruitful work done over the matter of raising the military power of the Soviet Union."

Work in the Comintern 
In 1924, David Petrovsky was sent to work in the Communist International as a Communist International representative in the communist parties of Great Britain, France and United States. Petrovsky came to England under the name of Bennett, and everyone - even the British Communists and his future wife Rose Cohen considered him American - a Yankee from the East Coast of the United States. He managed to avoid the British police for five years - a remarkable feat, which no subsequent Comintern representative ever equalled. His influence on the British Communist party was huge.  Western intelligence agencies didn't manage to declassify him. In France he was known as Humboldt, and he had passports in other names as well. He led the Anglo-American Secretariat and controlled the communist movements in Great Britain, Ireland, US, India, South Africa, Canada, Japan, Korea and Dutch Indonesia. He was concerned about the situation of black people in the US and South Africa. In 1928, Petrovsky was elected and served as a member of the presidium of the Executive Committee of the Communist International . "God Goldfarb" - called him old friends in US

Heading the higher and secondary technical education in Russia and the Soviet Union 
In 1929 D.Petrovsky was transferred to the Supreme Soviet of the National Economy - a member of the Presidium and the Chief of the General Directorate of higher and secondary technical education (GLAVVTUZ). His experience in organizing and managing the military education (1920-1924) after the revolution in 1917 in Russia was very useful.  One of his new tasks was to prepare 435,000 engineers and technicians in 5 years (1930-1935) during the Soviet Union industrialization period, while their number in 1929 was 66,000.

His old party comrades didn't believe that he would succeed with higher and secondary technical education in the Soviet Union, because as a former Bundist he wouldn't dare to hire former Mensheviks, Socialist Revolutionary Party members, the former right-wing and the Trotskyists (see:Trotskyism), as he could safely hire and appoint only those who knew how to vote according to party lines but not necessarily work.

But he once again proved them wrong. One of the strategies he used in early 1930s was opening smaller branch institutes on the basis of large multi-faculty educational institutions.
For example, on the basis of the Moscow Mining Academy - Moscow Mining Institute (Moscow State Mining University): Geological Prospecting Institute (Russian State Geological Prospecting University), Moscow Oil Institute (Gubkin Russian State University of Oil and Gas), Institute of Steel (National University of Science and Technology MISiS), Institute of Nonferrous Metals and Gold. On the basis of Bauman Moscow State Technical University - Moscow Aviation Institute, Moscow Power Engineering Institute, Moscow University of Civil Engineering, and other institutions in the Soviet Union. From 1930 to 1940, the number of higher and secondary technical colleges and institutions in the Soviet Union grew by 4 times and exceeded 150.

A failed escape 

David Petrovsky was aware of the danger emerging in the Soviet Union following the murder of Sergei Kirov in 1934, the assassination that functioned as the catalyst for the Great Purge.

In the summer of 1936 his London-born wife Rose Cohen went to London but was not permitted to make the trip with her son Alyosha, so he stayed behind. Her sister Nellie thought that Rose was "unhappy, and had it not been for Alyosha might not have returned".

At that time David Petrovsky planned on a business trip to America and got a permission to travel abroad from his supervisor Sergo Ordzhonikidze - the head of the Supreme Soviet of the National Economy and the head of the People's Commissariat of Heavy Industry of the Soviet Union. Sergo Ordzhonikidze, who knew Stalin closely, more than anyone else, saw what was happening in the country. Anticipating his fate, he wanted to save D. Petrovsky from the Stalin's terror and understood that he most likely would not return from a business trip. It seems that David and Rosa hoped to use their travels as an opportunity to leave almost simultaneously from the country and be saved. However, they had failed to acquire an exit visa for their son, and unwilling to leave without him, they remained in the Soviet Union.

Arrest and execution 
In February 1937, Sergo Ordzhonikidze died. In March 1937, David Petrovsky was arrested (as the head of the General Directorate of higher and secondary technical education in the People's Commissariat of Heavy Industry of the Soviet Union), and was accused for "counterrevolutionary" activity, and shot on September 10, 1937. In August 1937, his London-born wife Rose Cohen, a former Comintern courier, was arrested as an alleged British spy, and on November 28, 1937 she was also shot (rehabilitated in the Soviet Union in 1956). Rose Cohen was the head of the foreign department and the editor in the "Moscow Daily News" (The Moscow News) newspaper. Their seven-year-old son Alexey Petrovsky (Alyosha) was placed in an orphanage with the label "son of the enemies of the people."

Political rehabilitation and family 

After the 20th Congress of the Communist Party of the Soviet Union (1956), Petrovsky's only son filed an appeal to review his case, and on January 25, 1958, the Military Collegium of the Soviet Union Supreme Court invalidated the September 10, 1937 ruling against Petrovsky. All charges were dropped and the case was dismissed for lack of corpus delicti. Petrovsky was posthumously rehabilitated as a victim of political repressions.
 
He married Rose Cohen(1894-1937) a British feminist and suffragist, a founder member of the Communist Party of Great Britain. David Petrovsky and Rose Cohen had a son – Alexey Petrovsky (Alyosha). Alexey spent three years living in the orphanage after his parents' execution in 1937. In 1940 he was adopted from the orphanage by David Petrovsky's cousin Rebecca Belkina, a doctor, and a major of armed forces medical service during the Second World War. She succeeded in getting a permission for Alyosha's adoption when she lived with her family in a political exile in Tobolsk, Siberia under the Article 58 of the Soviet Penal Code. Alexey spent the rest of his childhood living in Siberia with her and her family. Afterwards, many years later, Alexey D. Petrovsky (1929–2010) earned a Ph.D. in Geological and Mineralogical Sciences, and became an Academician of the Russian Academy of Natural Sciences. Their grandson, Michael A. Petrovsky has a Ph.D. in Physics and Mathematics.

Proceedings 
David Petrovsky is the author of many publications, including more than ten monographs. The most significant works:
 Military education in the years of the revolution (1917-1924), M. 1924.
 The revolution and the counterrevolution in Ukraine, M. 1920.
 Capitalism and socialism (from Thomas More to Lenin), M. 1920 - the book is stored in the memorial office-library of Lenin in the Moscow Kremlin, Russia.
 The class struggle in postwar England, M. 1928.

Memory 
Honorary cadet of the Moscow Higher Military Command School of the Russian Armed Forces.

References

External link

1886 births
1937 deaths
Bundists
Jews from the Russian Empire
Members of the Socialist Party of America
Great Purge victims from Russia
Jews executed by the Soviet Union
Russian people of Jewish descent